Haplodiplatys is a genus of Asian earwigs erected by Walter Douglas Hincks in 1955.  It is the only member of the monotypic family Haplodiplatyidae, with many species originally placed in the genus Diplatys; a key to them was prepared by Alan Brindle.

Species
The Dermaptera Species File lists:

 Haplodiplatys basilewskyi (Brindle, 1966)
 Haplodiplatys bhowmiki (Srivastava & Saha, 1975)
 Haplodiplatys bhutanensis (Brindle, 1975)
 Haplodiplatys bidentatus (Hincks, 1955)
 Haplodiplatys bilobus Bey-Bienko, 1959
 Haplodiplatys brancuccii Srivastava, 1983
 Haplodiplatys chinensis (Hincks, 1955)
 Haplodiplatys convexiusculus Brindle, 1984
 Haplodiplatys crightoni Ross & Engel, 2013
 Haplodiplatys darwini Bey-Bienko, 1959
 Haplodiplatys fengyangensis (Wenbao, 1985)
 Haplodiplatys flavens (Hincks, 1955)
 Haplodiplatys glenis (Kapoor, 1968)
 Haplodiplatys hamatus (Brindle, 1972)
 Haplodiplatys hincksi Steinmann, 1974
 Haplodiplatys jansoni (Kirby, 1891)
 Haplodiplatys kivuensis (Hincks, 1951)
 Haplodiplatys malaisei (Hincks, 1947)
 Haplodiplatys niger Hincks, 1955 - type species
 Haplodiplatys olsufiewi (Borelli, 1932)
 Haplodiplatys orientalis Steinmann, 1974
 Haplodiplatys rileyi (Hincks, 1955)
 Haplodiplatys rufescens (Kirby, 1896)
 Haplodiplatys ruwenzoricus (Hincks, 1955)
 Haplodiplatys schawalleri Brindle, 1987
 Haplodiplatys severus (de Bormans, 1893)
 Haplodiplatys simlaensis (Kapoor, 1968)
 Haplodiplatys siva (Burr, 1904)
 Haplodiplatys srivastavai (Kapoor, 1974)
 Haplodiplatys stemmleri (Brindle, 1975)
 Haplodiplatys tibetanus (Hincks, 1955)
 Haplodiplatys tonkinensis (Hincks, 1955)
 Haplodiplatys transversalis (Brindle, 1983)
 Haplodiplatys triangulatus Brindle, 1987
 Haplodiplatys urbanii (Brindle, 1975)
 Haplodiplatys viator (Burr, 1904)

References

External links

Dermaptera genera
Earwigs
Insects of Asia